Kennedy Yanko (born October 21, 1988 in St. Louis, Missouri) is an American sculptor, painter and installation artist working with paint skins and found metal. Yanko sources material from salvage yards, utilizing discarded objects that she then manipulates or modifies to realize her vision. Her abstract work draws upon surrealism, abstract expressionism and physical austerities.

Paint Skins 
To create “paint skins,” Yanko pours large amounts of paint and lets it dry into a tarp-like material. From there, she sculpts the paint skin, using her whole body to manipulate the heavy sheet of paint. The paint skin thus becomes a structural material not dissimilar from the metal she utilizes in her sculptures. At times, the two materials are indistinguishable.

Residencies 
 2021 Artist in Residence, Rubell Museum in Miami
 2017 Fountainhead Residency, Miami

Public Art 
In 2019, Yanko installed her first public sculpture, titled 3 WAYS, as part of the Poydras Corridor Sculpture Exhibition, funded by the Helis Foundation, in New Orleans.

Public Collections 
 Rubell Museum, Miami
 Espacio Tacuari, Buenos Aires, Argentina
 The Bunker Artspace, West Palm Beach, Florida

External links 
 Artist's website

References 

1988 births
Living people
21st-century American women artists
American women sculptors
Artists from St. Louis